Lyndsay Pruett is an American violinist. She is currently a member of the Jon Stickley Trio.

Pruett graduated from Belmont University in Nashville, Tennessee in 2006 with a degree in Commercial Violin Performance.
She has toured with Futureman as well as the Black Mozart Festival.  In addition to the Jon Stickley Trio, Pruett performs with the Asheville Tango Orchestra, the Hot Point Trio, Galen Kipar Project, and Taylor Martin's Engine.

References

American violinists
Belmont University alumni
Living people
Year of birth missing (living people)